Hindreus is a genus of harvestmen in the family Phalangiidae.

Species
 Hindreus crucifer H. Kauri, 1985
 Hindreus elegans H. Kauri, 1985
 Hindreus leleupi (Roewer, 1961)

References

Harvestmen
Harvestman genera